The Smovies (Short + Movies) is a film competition created in Abu Dhabi, UAE in April 2015 by BrandMoxie.

Guidelines 

The shortlisted videos are shown on the Smovies website. The Smovies team selects an expert panel of judges who choose the winners each season. The winning and short-listed videos are showcased at various events and during the awarding ceremony. The winners are announced at the end of every season.

Season 1 

The first season was launched on April 1, 2015 and ended in June. The season was titled #plsdontstealmyshow in an attempt to raise awareness about movie watching etiquette. VOX Cinemas took this opportunity to enlighten movie goers about cinema etiquette and to create the best cinema-going experience in the region. Participants were asked to create an ad for the campaign which was then shown across their screens.

There were 27 short-listed films:

 A Spartan Surprise
 The Epiphany
 Please Don't Steal My Show
 You Are Not Alone
 Sameer Antulay
 Nonsense
 TV Watching
 I Want To Enjoy It Too!
 Not Cool
 What Do You Prefer?
 Don't Kill My Moment
 Switch Off!
 What Did I Miss?
 ENOUGH
 Lightsaber Rage
 My Feet Smell Sweet
 Selfie With Ghost
 Calls Ruin Movies
 Show Stealers
 Seeing Double
 Who Has My Daughter?
 Don't Steal My Show- Sparsh Srivastava
 The Laptop
 Gamer Guy
 Book Reading
 What Did I Miss?
 Smovie by Hammad

First place went to A Spartan Surprise by Faisal Hashmi. Second place went to The Epiphany by Shezah Salam, and third place went to Please Don't Steal My Show by Vimin Thomas.

Season 2 

The second season was titled The Message and lead to the hashtag #smoviesmessage. This edition ran from June to September 2015 and focused on conveying a message regarding social consciousness, and fell under the narrative category.

References 

http://www.thenational.ae/blogs/scene-heard/vox-focuses-on-cinema-etiquette
http://www.elfann.com/news/show/1131681

Culture in Abu Dhabi
Short film festivals